The 2011 WNBA draft is the league's annual process for determining which teams receive the rights to negotiate with players entering the league. The draft was held on April 11, 2011 at the ESPN studios in Bristol, Connecticut. The first round was shown on ESPN (HD), while the second and third rounds were shown on NBA TV and ESPNU.

Draft lottery
The lottery selection to determine the order of the top four picks in the 2011 draft occurred on November 2, 2010. The Minnesota Lynx won the first pick, while the Tulsa Shock, Chicago Sky and Lynx were awarded the second, third and fourth picks respectively. The remaining first-round picks and all the second- and third-round picks were assigned to teams in reverse order of their win–loss records in the previous season.

Below were the chances for each team to get specific picks in the 2010 draft lottery, rounded to three decimal places:

Invited players
The WNBA announced on April 6, 2011 that 15 players had been invited to attend the draft. Unless indicated otherwise, all players listed are Americans who played at U.S. colleges.
 Danielle Adams, Texas A&M
 Jessica Breland, North Carolina
  Liz Cambage, Bulleen Boomers (Australia)
 Sydney Colson, Texas A&M
 Victoria Dunlap, Kentucky
 Amber Harris, Xavier
 Jantel Lavender, Ohio State
 Maya Moore, Connecticut
 Kayla Pedersen, Stanford
 Ta'Shia Phillips, Xavier
 Jeanette Pohlen, Stanford
 Danielle Robinson, Oklahoma
 Carolyn Swords, Boston College
 Jasmine Thomas, Duke
 Courtney Vandersloot, Gonzaga

Transactions
March 11, 2010: Atlanta and San Antonio swap second-round picks as part of the Michelle Snow transaction.
April 7, 2010: Connecticut receives a second-round pick from Tulsa as part of the Chante Black/Amber Holt transaction.
April 8, 2010: Minnesota receives Connecticut's first-round pick and Tulsa's second-round pick from Connecticut as part of the Kelsey Griffin transaction.
May 13, 2010: Chicago receives a second-round pick from Los Angeles as part of the Kristi Toliver transaction.
May 27, 2010: Tulsa receives a second-round pick from Indiana as part of the Shavonte Zellous transaction.
July 23, 2010: Tulsa receives a first-round pick from Phoenix as part of the Kara Braxton/Nicole Ohlde transaction.
Source

Key

Draft selections

Round 1

Round 2

Round 3

References

External links
2011 WNBA draft board

Women's National Basketball Association Draft
Draft